is a Japanese volleyball player who plays for Hisamitsu Springs.

She is a left-handed Opposite spiker known for her high vertical jump and high spike speed. She has been part of Japan women's national volleyball team since 2013, as a lead scorer in her debut in the 2013 Montreux Volley Masters where she was awarded "Best Spiker" and was also the lead scorer during the 2016 Summer Olympics.

Career
Miyu Nagaoka's career begins at school level in local leagues. In the same period she plays in the Japanese youth national teams: in 2007 she wins the Asian and Oceanian Under-17 championship, where she receives the MVP award; in 2008 she won the Under-18 Asian and Oceanian Championships. Two years later, in 2010, she made her senior international debut, taking part in the Asian Cup.

In the 2010-11 season she began her professional career with Hisamitsu Springs, finishing third in the league; in the following season she is her finalist in the league, but she comes out defeated against the Toray Arrows. In the 2012-13 season she won both the Empress Cup and the Scudetto, being awarded as the MVP of the championship and being included in the ideal sextet; she then completes the perfect season by winning the V.League Top Match and the Kurowashiki Tournament; she with the national team she wins the silver medal at the 2013 Asian and Oceanian championships and the bronze medal at the 2013 Grand Champions Cup.

In the 2012-13 V.Premier League season she was awarded Best 6 and Most Valuable Player.

In the 2013-14 championship she wins once again the Empress Cup, the Scudetto and the AVC Club Championships, being awarded as the MVP of the tournament; she with the national team she won the silver medal at the 2014 World Grand Prix. In the following championship she won once again the Empress Cup, only to be defeated in the championship final, still collecting some individual recognition.

In the 2015-16 season she triumphs again both in the championship, where she again obtains the prize of best player of the tournament and inclusion in the ideal sextet, and in the Empress Cup, while in the AVC Club Championships, finished in second place, she is awarded as the best hitter; in the following championship she wins the fifth Empress Cup and reaches the final of the championship again, being again included in the ideal sextet of the competition, but in March 2017 she suffers an injury to the left anterior cruciate ligament that keeps her away from the playing fields for over thirteen months causing her to miss the entire 2017-18 championship won by her team.

In the 2018-19 season she moved on loan to Italy, where she played the Serie A1 with Imoco, winning the 2018 Italian Super Cup; due to a new left knee injury suffered in December 2018, she returns to her homeland for rehabilitation: however, although not on the pitch, she is among the winners of the 2018-19 championship.

Miyu missed 2020 Summer Olympics due to her knee injury. With the support from her family and teammates, she carries on her career and back to court in 2020.

Clubs
  Hisamitsu Springs (2010-2018, 2020-present)
  Imoco Volley Conegliano (2018)

Awards

Individuals
 2007 Asian Youth Girls Volleyball Championship - "MVP", "Best Spiker"
 2012-13: V.Premier League - "MVP", "Best6"
 2013: Kurowashiki All Japan Volleyball Tournament - "Best6"
 2013 Montreux Volley Masters - "Best Spiker"
 2013-14 :V.Premier League - "Best6"
 2014 Asian Women's Club Volleyball Championship - "MVP"
 2014 FIVB World Grand Prix - "2nd Best Outside Spiker"
 2014-15: V.Premier League - "Fighting Spirit award", "Best6"
 2015 Asian Women's Club Volleyball Championship - "Best Outside Spiker"
 2015-16: V.Premier League - "MVP", "Best6"
 2016-17: V.Premier League - "Best6"

Clubs
 2011-2012 V.Premier League -  Runner-Up, with Hisamitsu Springs.
 2012 Empress's Cup -  Champion, with Hisamitsu Springs.
 2012-2013 V.Premier League -  Champion, with Hisamitsu Springs.
 2013 - Japan-Korea V.League Top Match -  Champion, with Hisamitsu Springs.
 2013 - Kurowashiki All Japan Volleyball Tournament -  Champion, with Hisamitsu Springs.
 2013 - Empress's Cup -  Champion, with Hisamitsu Springs.
 2013-2014 V.Premier League -  Champion, with Hisamitsu Springs.
 2014 Asian Club Championship -  Champion, with Hisamitsu Springs.
 2014 - Empress's Cup -  Champion, with Hisamitsu Springs.
 2014-2015 V.Premier League -  Runner-Up, with Hisamitsu Springs.
 2015 Asian Club Championship -  Runner-Up, with Hisamitsu Springs.
 2015 - Empress's Cup -  Champion, with Hisamitsu Springs.
 2015-2016 V.Premier League -  Champion, with Hisamitsu Springs.
 2016 - Empress's Cup -  Champion, with Hisamitsu Springs.
 2016-2017 V.Premier League -  Runner-Up, with Hisamitsu Springs.
 2018 - Kurowashiki All Japan Volleyball Tournament -  Runner-Up, with Hisamitsu Springs.
2018  - Italian Super Cup -  Champion, with Imoco Volley Conegliano

National team
 2013 Asian Championship -  Silver medal
 2013 Women's World Grand Champions Cup -  Bronze medal
 2014 FIVB World Grand Prix -  Silver medal
 2014 World Championship - 7th place
 2015 World Cup – 5th place
  2016  Olympic Games – 5th place (tied)
 2018 World Championship - 6th place

Junior Team
 2007 Asian Youth Girls Volleyball Championship –  Gold Medal
  2008 Asian Junior Women's Volleyball Championship –  Gold Medal

References

External links
JVA Biography
V.League Biography
Hisamitsu Springs Biography

Japanese women's volleyball players
Living people
1991 births
People from Miyama, Fukuoka
Sportspeople from Fukuoka Prefecture
Japan women's international volleyball players
Olympic volleyball players of Japan
Volleyball players at the 2016 Summer Olympics
Volleyball players at the 2018 Asian Games
Asian Games competitors for Japan